Marian Chandler may refer to:

Marian Otis Chandler (1866–1952), Secretary of the Times-Mirror Company
Marian Chandler (All My Children), a fictional character in the U.S. TV soap opera All My Children